The Willow Park Patrol Cabin, also known as the Willow Park Ranger Station and the Willow Park Cook and Mess Hall, was built in Rocky Mountain National Park in 1923 to the design of members of the National Park Service Landscape Engineering Division under the supervision of Daniel Ray Hull. The cabin is an early example of the National Park Service Rustic style that was gaining favor with the Park Service. The cabin, along with the Willow Park Stable, originally accommodated maintenance crews on the Fall River Road.

See also
Architects of the National Park Service
National Register of Historic Places listings in Rocky Mountain National Park
National Register of Historic Places listings in Larimer County, Colorado

References

External links

 at the National Park Service's NRHP database

Park buildings and structures on the National Register of Historic Places in Colorado
Historic American Buildings Survey in Colorado
Houses completed in 1923
Buildings and structures in Larimer County, Colorado
Log cabins in the United States
National Register of Historic Places in Rocky Mountain National Park
National Park Service rustic in Colorado
National Park Service ranger stations
National Register of Historic Places in Larimer County, Colorado
Log buildings and structures on the National Register of Historic Places in Colorado
1923 establishments in Colorado